Rhode Island elected its member August 28, 1810.

See also 
 United States House of Representatives elections, 1810 and 1811
 List of United States representatives from Rhode Island

1810
Rhode Island
United States House of Representatives